A disclaimer is generally any statement intended to specify or delimit the scope of rights and obligations that may be exercised and enforced by parties in a legally recognized relationship.

Disclaimer may also refer to:

 Disclaimer (King Creosote album), 2001
 Disclaimer (Seether album), 2002
 Disclaimer II, an album by Seether
 Disclaimer (patent), in patent law, words identifying, in a claim, subject-matter that is not claimed
 Disclaimer of interest, an attempt by a person to renounce their legal right to benefit from an inheritance